The 2006–07 Serie C2 was the football (soccer) league season of Italian Serie C2 for the years 2006 and 2007. It was divided into two phases: the regular season, played from September 3, 2006 to May 13, 2007 and the playoff phase. Once the regular season was over, teams placed 2nd to 5th entered a playoff to determine the second team in each division to be promoted to Serie C1. At the same time, teams placed 14th to 17th entered a playout for the right to remain in Serie C2 the following season.

As usual, Serie C2 was composed by three divisions, whose teams were divided geographically. Division C2/A was mainly composed by Northern Italy and Sardinian teams, whereas division C2/B included North-Central and Central Italy teams, with the exception of two teams from Campania (Paganese and Giugliano), and division C2/C was represented by teams hailing from Central-Southern Italy and Sicily.

Teams finishing first in the regular season, plus one team winning the playoff round from each division were promoted to Serie C1; teams finishing last in the regular season, plus two relegation playoff losers from each division were relegated to Serie D.  In all, six teams were promoted to Serie C1, and nine teams were relegated to Serie D.

Teams relegating to Serie D also lost the right to maintain their professional status.

Standings

Serie C2/A
Final table

Serie C2/B
Final table

Serie C2/C
Final table

Promotion and relegation playoffs

Serie C2/A

Promotion
Promotion playoff semifinals
First legs played May 27, 2007; return legs played June 3, 2007

Promotion playoff finals
First leg played June 10, 2007; return leg played June 17, 2007

Pergocrema promoted to Serie C1

Relegation
Relegation playoffs
First legs played May 27, 2007; return legs played June 3, 2007

Biellese and Montichiari relegated to Serie D

Serie C2/B

Promotion
Promotion playoff semifinals
First legs played May 27, 2007; return legs played June 3, 2007

Promotion playoff finals
First leg played June 10, 2007; return leg played June 17, 2007

Paganese promoted to Serie C1

Relegation
Relegation playoffs
First legs played May 27, 2007; return legs played June 3, 2007

Boca San Lazzaro and Rieti relegated to Serie D

Serie C2/C

Promotion
Promotion playoff semifinals
First legs played May 27, 2007; return legs played June 3, 2007

Promotion playoff finals
First leg played June 10, 2007; return leg played June 17, 2007

Potenza promoted to Serie C1

Relegation
Relegation playoffs
First legs played May 27, 2007; return legs played June 3, 2007

Pro Vasto and Nocerina relegated to Serie D

Notes and references

Clubs

Serie C2/A

Serie C2/B

Serie C2/C

Serie C2 seasons
Italy
4